Chance of Rain may refer to:

 Probability of precipitation
 Chance of Rain (Laurel Halo album), 2013
 Chance of Rain (Stefanie Heinzmann album), 2015